Norman Olson may refer to:

Norman Eugene Olsen (December 1, 1914 – October 1977) was an American football tackle
Norman E. Olson (March 19, 1915 – April 8, 1944) U.S. Army Air Forces World War II flying ace
Norman Olson (born 1946) is an American militia movement activist

See also 
Olson (surname)
Olsen (surname)
 Olsson

Disambiguation pages